Yanar Dagh (meaning "burning mountain") is a natural gas fire which blazes continuously on a hillside on the Absheron Peninsula on the Caspian Sea near Baku, the capital of Azerbaijan (a country which itself is known as "the Land of Fire"). Flames jet into the air  from a thin, porous sandstone layer. Administratively, Yanar Dagh belongs to Absheron District of Azerbaijan.

Unlike mud volcanoes, the Yanar Dagh flame burns fairly steadily, as it involves a steady seep of gas from the subsurface. It is claimed that the Yanar Dagh flame was only noted when accidentally lit by a shepherd in the 1950s. There is no seepage of mud or liquid, which distinguishes it from the nearby mud volcanoes of Lokbatan or Gobustan.

On the territory of Yanar Dagh, the State Historical-Cultural and Natural Reserve was established by the Presidential decree dated 2 May 2007 which operates under the control of State Tourism Agency of Azerbaijan. After major overhaul between 2017-2019, Yanar dagh Museum and Yanar dagh Cromlech Stone Exhibition were launched in the area of the Reserve.

In the first millennium BCE, the fire played a role in the Zoroastrian religion, as the link between humans and the supernatural spheres.

Geography

The Yanar Dagh fire is never extinguished. Around this open fireplace the atmosphere is filled with the smell of gas. The surface flames result from the steady gas emissions from underlying soils.

Even the surface of streams near Yanar Dagh fire can be ignited with a match. These streams, which otherwise appear calm, are known as Yanar Bulag: "burning springs." There are several such springs in the vicinity of the Vilascay River, where the local people take curative baths.

Alexandre Dumas, during one of his visits to the area, described a similar fire he saw in the region inside one of the Zoroastrian fire temples built around it. Only a handful of fire mountains exist today in the world, and most are located in Azerbaijan. Due to the large concentration of natural gas under the Absheron Peninsula, natural flames burned there throughout antiquity and were reported on by historical writers such as Marco Polo.

Causes

The reason offered for the Yanar Dagh fires is the result of hydrocarbon gases emanating from below the earth's surface. Apart from Yanar Dagh, the most famous site of such a fire is the Fire Temple near Baku, off the Greater Caucasus, which is a religious site known as an ateshgah, meaning temple of fire. It has also been inferred that such fires could be the cause for "thermal metamorphism."

Like the flames of Yanar Dagh, the Ateshgah of Baku's flame was a manifestation of the seepage of natural gas from porous strata, but the natural flow at Ateshgah ceased some time ago and the flames seen there now are fed from a gas main for touristic effect - whereas those at Yanar Dagh are still entirely natural.

According to a study carried out by the scientists and geologists of the Geological Survey of Azerbaijan, analyses of four samples taken from Yanar Dagh revealed that the area of  maximum flux was situated at the upper side of the fault scarp - the very area from which the flames emanate. The value of microseepage recorded was in the range of 103 mg m−2 d−1 at approximately 30 metres (~100 ft) from the fire, on the upper part of the study area. It has been inferred that the degassing area is larger than the measured area, and it is very likely that the microseepage is pervasive along the fault zone. This fault scarp is inferred as a part of the huge Balakhany-Fatmai structure on the Absheron Peninsula.

Yanardagh State Historical, Cultural and Natural Reserve 
In order to protect this landmark and support tourism in the area, the Yanardagh State Historical, Cultural and Natural Reserve was established by presidential decree dated 2 May 2007. It operates under control of the State Tourism Agency and is located in the village of Mammadli (Absheron District). After major overhauls between 2017-2019, the Yanardagh Museum and Yanardagh Cromlech Stone Exhibition were launched within the territory of the reserve. The reserve covers an area of 64.55 hectares with a 500-seat amphitheater for outdoor concerts. It features a 3-zoned museum with exhibitions displaying ancient stones and pieces of craftsmanship used by locals. There are also tombstones, ancient kurgans, and two burial grounds with historic graves.

See also

Zoroastrianism in Azerbaijan
Ramana, Azerbaijan
Khinalug
Darvaza gas crater

References

Zoroastrianism in Azerbaijan
Mountains of Azerbaijan
Persistent natural fires